Lloyd Griffith is an English comedian, actor, presenter and singer from Grimsby, England, and was a presenter on Sky Sports show Soccer AM until the end of the 2018-2019 season.

Career
Lloyd Griffith originally trained as a classical choral singer at the University of Exeter before becoming a comedian in 2010. He started in stand up comedy before starring in comedy short Inheritance and on the BBC Radio 1 Comedy Lounge in 2014. Prior to 2019, Griffith performed as tour support for Rob Beckett and Jack Whitehall.

Griffith started his TV career on BBC Three show Taxi to Training in which he would interview professional footballers (such as Troy Deeney, Asmir Begovic and Dele Alli) as he drove them to their respective training grounds. He also appeared on BBC, Sky TV and Comedy Central shows including Drunk History, Rugby's Funniest Moments and Sweat the Small Stuff. Griffith has recently made frequent appearances on Comedy Central Live at The Comedy Store, Comedy Central's Roast Battle and E4's 8 out of 10 Cats. He also had a small recurring part in the NBC comedy Ted Lasso. Recent acting credits have including Not Going Out, It's a Sin, & Bounty Hunters.

He was announced as a new host of Soccer AM, when he replaced Helen Chamberlain for the 2017-18 run of the show. Griffith left the show in July 2019, before the start of the 2019-20 run. In 2019, Griffith served as a host of Flinch, a physical gameshow for Netflix, alongside Seann Walsh, and Desiree Burch. He also presented a documentary on BBC2 called Can You Beat The Bookies, unpacking how difficult it is to turn a profit gambling, to critical acclaim.

Outside of stand up comedy and his television work, Griffith is also well known for his YouTube series Premier League Fan Reactions with the weekly videos regularly reaching upwards of 100K views. Until 2019, the series was hosted on the YouTube channel "The Football Republic" where he would often appear in other videos alongside fellow comedian Rhys James. Griffith hosted a one-off 23 minute long show called Quest for the Best made by EA Sports for Sky Sports featuring Lionel Messi, Ryan Giggs, Gary Neville, Adebayo Akinfenwa and Carles Rexach. He has also played for Hashtag United F.C. as a goalkeeper and subsequently appeared on their Youtube channel.

Following the death of Queen Elizabeth II, Griffith performed God Save The King at Blundell Park prior to the 13 September 2022 EFL League Two fixture Grimsby Town vs Gillingham, and on 18 September 2022 at the Brentford Community Stadium before that day's Premier League fixture Brentford vs Arsenal.

Personal life
Griffith is a keen football fan, supporting home town team Grimsby Town. On occasion, he does commentary on some of their games for BBC Radio Humberside.

Griffith was a chorister at Grimsby Minster and then read music at the University of Exeter where he was also a choral scholar in the Exeter Cathedral choir. He has featured a number of times on Songs of Praise. Griffith still sings professionally and can be seen singing as a deputy in the choirs of St George's Chapel Windsor Castle and Westminster Abbey. His favourite classical composer is Thomas Tallis and his favourite venue to sing in is the Mary Harris Memorial Chapel of the Holy Trinity, part of the University of Exeter where Griffith studied.

Filmography

Film

Television

Acting roles

Presenting and Guest Appearances

References

External links

Lloyd Griffith on Twitter

Living people
People from Grimsby
English comedians
British television presenters
Soccer AM
Hashtag United F.C. players
Year of birth missing (living people)